Izatha katadiktya is a moth of the family Oecophoridae. It is endemic to New Zealand, where it is known from the eastern South Island, and probably Hawkes Bay.

The wingspan is 21–27.5 mm for males and 21.5–30 mm for females. Adults have been recorded in October, November and January.

Larvae feed on dead wood.

Etymology
The species name is from the Greek kata, implying a downward direction (towards the base), and diktyon (meaning a net) and refers to the net-like basal blotch on the forewing, which distinguishes this species from members of the picarella complex and from Izatha churtoni.

References

Oecophorinae
Moths described in 2010
Endemic fauna of New Zealand
Moths of New Zealand
Endemic moths of New Zealand